House name may refer to:
the name of a house or estate German toponymy or anthroponymy, see Hofname
a type of collective pen name, see  Pen name#Collective names

See also
Household name (disambiguation)